Volcano is a 1997 American disaster film directed by Mick Jackson and produced by Neal H. Moritz and Andrew Z. Davis. The film stars Tommy Lee Jones, Anne Heche, Don Cheadle, and Keith David and tells the story of an effort to divert the path of a dangerous lava flow through the streets of Los Angeles following the formation of a volcano at the La Brea Tar Pits. The storyline was conceived from a screenplay written by Jerome Armstrong and Billy Ray, and was inspired by the 1943 formation of the Parícutin volcano in Mexico.

Volcano was released by 20th Century Fox in the United States on April 25, 1997. It received mixed reviews from critics and grossed $122 million worldwide on a $90 million budget.

Plot

In downtown Los Angeles, an earthquake strikes. Mike Roark, the new director of the city's Office of Emergency Management, insists on coming to work to help out with the crisis even though he has been on vacation with his daughter Kelly. His associate Emmit Reese notes that the quake caused no major damage, but seven utility workers are later burned to death in a storm drain at MacArthur Park.

As a precaution, Mike tries to halt the subway lines near the location of the earthquake. MTA Chairman Stan Olber opposes, believing that there is no threat to the trains. Seismologist Dr. Amy Barnes believes that a volcano may be forming beneath the city; however, she has insufficient evidence to make Mike take action.

The next morning, Amy and her assistant Rachel venture in the storm sewer to investigate. While they take samples, another earthquake strikes the Los Angeles area, but this time is more stronger and violent. Rachel falls into a crack that is later engulfed by a rush of hot gases, being suffocating down under to death. A subway train gets hit by a falling debris underground and crashes, and a power outage occurs across the whole area. Later, in the La Brea Tar Pits, a steam burst erupted from manholes which causes massive accidents and when suddenly volcanic smoke and ash billow out, followed by lava bombs that devastates several buildings which ignite fires and explosions, traffic lights, and cause a fire truck to flip onto its side.

As Mike helps injured firefighters out of the area, a newly-formed underground volcano erupts from the tar pits and lava begins to flow down Wilshire Boulevard. The lava incinerates everything in its path and kills two firefighters in a sided fire truck. The Roarks become separated, as Kelly is injured when a lava bomb burns her leg badly.
 
In the Red Line metro tunnel, the passengers in a crashed subway train are rendered unconscious by severe heat and toxic gases, whilst the driver was unable to open the doors. Meanwhile, Stan leads his team through the tunnel to the crashed train to search for survivors. They manage to save everyone, and Stan finds the unconscious train driver just as lava reaches the train and begins to flow underneath it. With the train disintegrating, Stan chooses to sacrifice himself to save the driver and jumps into the lava to be able to throw him to safety. After throwing the driver to the team and saving his life, Stan is consumed and died from the lava.

Mike, Amy, and LAPD lieutenant Ed Fox devise a plan to use concrete barriers to create a blockade, which obstructs the lava in its path. A fleet of helicopters dump water collected from the ocean to subdue the lava and volcano, forming a crust and making the plan a success. However, Amy uses a rope hanging camera to lower it down to the subway tunnel to see if anything could happen below on the footage screen but when soon, a lava also consumes it which caughted on footage. Amy thinks that the magma is still flowing underground through the Red Line subway extension and calculates that the another eruption will occur at the end of the Red Line at Cedars-Sinai Hospital. After calculating the speed of the flowing lava, Amy and Mike realize that the lava will reach the end of the Red Line in thirty minutes.

Mike devises another plan to demolish a 22-story condominium building to block the lava's path from flowing towards the hospital and the rest of the West Side of Los Angeles. The lava reaches the dead end of the subway tunnel extension and bursts out of the ground in a massive fiery geyser. Two men sacrifice their lives to detonate the final explosive charge by giving the all-clear to ignite the charges. Mike then spots Kelly nearby, trying to retrieve Tommy, a little boy who wandered off; the two are in the direct path of the collapsing building. Mike barely manages to save them from being crushed as the building collapses. The plan succeeds, and the lava flows directly into the ocean. The Roarks and Tommy escape from the wreckage alive. In the aftermath, hundreds are dead, thousands are injured, and billions of dollars of damage is caused.

It starts to rain, the survivors heave a sigh of relief, and the Roarks catch a ride with Amy. The film ends with a view of the volcano and a graphic that reads "Name: Mount Wilshire. Location: Los Angeles, California. Status: Active.", accompanied by the opening of the Randy Newman song "I Love L.A."

Cast

Production

Filming
Filming was primarily on location in Los Angeles, California. Various filming sites included MacArthur Park, Cedars-Sinai Medical Center and the La Brea Tar Pits.  Extensive special effects surrounding certain aspects of the film such as the lava flow were created by ten separate digital effects companies including VIFX, Digital Magic Company, Light Matters Inc., Pixel Envy and Anatomorphex. An 80% full-size replica of Wilshire Boulevard, which was one of the largest sets ever constructed in the United States, was assembled in Torrance, California. The computer-generated imagery was coordinated and supervised by Dale Ettema and Mat Beck. Between visuals, miniatures, and animation, over 300 technicians were involved in the production aspects of the special effects.

Music
The score for the film was originally composed and orchestrated by musical conductor Alan Silvestri. Recording artists James Newton Howard and Dillinger among others, contributed songs to the music listing. The audio soundtrack in Compact Disc format featuring 8 tracks, was officially released by the American recording label Varèse Sarabande on April 22, 1997. The sound effects in the film were supervised by Christopher Boyes. The mixing of the sound elements were orchestrated by Jim Tanenbaum and Dennis Sands.

Reception
Among mainstream critics in the US, Volcano received mixed reviews. Rotten Tomatoes reports that 49% of 47 sampled critics gave the film a positive review, with an average score of 5.10/10. The website's critical consensus reads, "Volcanos prodigious pyrotechnics and Tommy Lee Jones crotchety sneers at lava aren't quite enough to save this routine disaster film." At Metacritic, which assigns a weighted average using critical reviews, the film received a score of 55  out of 100 based on 22 reviews, indicating "mixed or average reviews". Audiences polled by CinemaScore gave the film an average grade of "B+" on an A+ to F scale. In 1997, the film was nominated for a Golden Raspberry Award in the category of "Worst Reckless Disregard for Human Life and Public Property", but lost to Con Air.

Janet Maslin wrote in The New York Times, "Volcano begins so excitably and hurtles so quickly into fiery pandemonium," but noted that "in the disaster realm, it's not easy to have it all. A film this technically clever can't get away with patronizing and familiar genre cliches." Roger Ebert in the Chicago Sun-Times called the film a "surprisingly cheesy disaster epic" while musing, "The lava keeps flowing for much of the movie, never looking convincing. I loved it when the firemen aimed their hoses way offscreen into the middle of the lava flow, instead of maybe aiming them at the leading edge of the lava—which they couldn't do, because the lava was a visual effect, and not really there." In the San Francisco Chronicle, Mick LaSalle wrote that "Things go bad after Volcano plays its last card — the lava — and from there it has nothing to show but more of the same." Owen Gleiberman of Entertainment Weekly said, "Volcano is cheese, all right, but it's tangy cheese. I'm not sure I've ever seen a disaster movie in which special effects this realistic and accomplished were put to the service of a premise this outlandish."

Walter Addiego of the San Francisco Examiner opined  that "Volcano offers a bit of humor, a minimum of plot distraction and the joys of watching molten rock ooze down Wilshire Boulevard." Left equally impressed was James Berardinelli of ReelViews. He described the character of Mike Roark as "a wonderfully heroic figure — a man of action who never has time to rest. The fate of the city rests on his shoulders, and he knows it." He added: "Volcano has opened the "summer" movie season at an astoundingly early late-April date... This isn't the kind of film where it's worth waiting for the video tape — it's too big and brash, and demands the speakers and atmosphere of a state-of-the-art theater." Kenneth Turan of the Los Angeles Times asserted that the film "glows with heat. Lava heat. The coast may be toast, but it's the lava, covering everything like a malevolent tide of melted butter, that makes this a disaster picture that's tastier than usual."
 
Writing for Time Out, author TCh said, "The most striking aspect of this fun, old-fashioned disaster movie is the novelty of seeing the most familiar of backdrops used as a creative resource in its own right." Not entirely impressed was Margaret McGurk writing for The Cincinnati Enquirer. She stated that the high-caliber special effects were "still fun, but all this lock-step storytelling is wearing thin." In a hint of commendation, McGurk added, "On its own escapist terms, Volcano dishes up a textbook serving of low-I.Q., high-energy entertainment." Marc Savlov of The Austin Chronicle called Volcano was a "laughably ridiculous take on what we all secretly dream of: Los Angeles, washed away in a huge, molten tide of cheese — uh, lava, I mean." Savlov added, "Screenwriters Jerome Armstrong and Billy Ray have crammed the script with...reams of very, very bad dialogue. So bad, in fact, that the screening audience I viewed Volcano with seemed to enjoy it immensely, hooting and hollering and laughing as though it were an old episode of Mystery Science Theater 3000."

Rita Kempley of The Washington Post  wondered why "there's no volcano in "Volcano"?...The hokey disaster drama features towering plumes of smoke, a splendid display of fireworks and brimstone, and rivers of molten magma, but I'll be darned if there's a burning mountain." Todd McCarthy of Variety was more positive, writing that "first-time screenwriters Jerome Armstrong and Billy Ray waste no time with exposition or scene-setting, starting the fireworks with a nerve-jangling morning earthquake that puts city workers on alert for possible damage."

Box office
Volcano premiered in cinemas on April 25, 1997. At its widest distribution in the United States, the film was screened at 2,777 theaters. The film grossed $14,581,740 in box office business in Canada and the United States on its opening weekend, averaging $5,256 in revenue per theater. During that first weekend in release, the film opened in first place beating out the films Romy & Michelle's High School Reunion and Anaconda. The film's revenue dropped by 37% in its second week of release, earning $9,099,743. In the month of June during its final weekend showing in theaters, the film came out in 12th place grossing $602,076. The film went on to top out in the United States and Canada at $49,323,468 in total ticket sales through a 7-week theatrical run. In other markets, the film took in an additional $73,500,000 in box office business for an international total of $122,800,000. For 1997 as a whole, the film would cumulatively rank at a box office performance position of 39.

Home media
Following its cinematic release in theaters, the film was released in VHS video format on May 26, 1998. The Region 1 Code widescreen edition of the film was released on DVD in the United States on March 9, 1999. Special features for the DVD include interactive menus, scene selection and the  original theatrical trailer. It is not enhanced for widescreen televisions. The film was released on Blu-ray Disc on October 1, 2013 by Starz/Anchor Bay.

See also

 Dante's Peak - Another volcano based film released in 1997

References

External links

 
 
 
 
 

1997 films
1990s disaster films
1990s thriller drama films
20th Century Fox films
American disaster films
American thriller drama films
1990s English-language films
Films about volcanoes
Films directed by Mick Jackson
Films produced by Neal H. Moritz
Films produced by Lauren Shuler Donner
Films scored by Alan Silvestri
Films set in California
Films set in Los Angeles
Films shot in Los Angeles
Rail transport films
Films with screenplays by Billy Ray
Original Film films
1997 drama films
Films about firefighting
Films about fires
1990s American films